Daniel Ulises Leyva (born May 5, 2003) is an American professional soccer player who plays as a defensive midfielder for Major League Soccer club Seattle Sounders FC.

Club career
Leyva was raised in Las Vegas, Nevada; his father Ulises had played in the youth academy of Club América in Mexico City, but left the sport to pursue a career in civil engineering. Leyva played for the Barcelona USA Academy in Las Vegas before joining the Seattle Sounders FC Academy at the age of 13. Leyva was placed on Seattle's under-15 team ahead of the 2017–18 season, but was later moved to the under-17 squad.

He made his debut for the Sounders reserve team in the United Soccer League (USL) on September 29, 2018, during a 3–1 loss to San Antonio FC, becoming the second-youngest player in league history. Leyva signed a full USL contract with the team the following month and began training with the senior team during the 2019 preseason, appearing in friendlies against the Portland Timbers and Club Nacional. Leyva signed a homegrown contract with Seattle Sounders FC on April 9, 2019, becoming the youngest player in the team's history. He made his first-team debut on June 5, 2019, as a late substitute during an away loss to the Montreal Impact, becoming the third-youngest player in the league's history.

International career
In October 2019, Leyva was named to the United States squad for the 2019 FIFA U-17 World Cup in Brazil.

Leyva who has only played for U.S. youth national teams, also holds the option to be called up by Mexico.

Personal life
Born in the United States, Leyva is of Mexican descent.

Career statistics

Club

Honors
Seattle Sounders FC
MLS Cup: 2019
CONCACAF Champions League: 2022

Individual
CONCACAF U-17 Championship Best XI: 2019

References

External links

2003 births
Living people
Sportspeople from Las Vegas
Soccer players from Las Vegas
American sportspeople of Mexican descent
American soccer players
Association football midfielders
Major League Soccer players
USL Championship players
MLS Next Pro players
Tacoma Defiance players
Seattle Sounders FC players
Homegrown Players (MLS)
United States men's youth international soccer players
United States men's under-20 international soccer players